Frans Lamberechts (7 March 1909 – 1988) was a Belgian sculptor. His work was part of the sculpture event in the art competition at the 1936 Summer Olympics.

References

1909 births
1988 deaths
20th-century Belgian sculptors
20th-century male artists
Belgian sculptors
Olympic competitors in art competitions
People from Molenbeek-Saint-Jean